Carterica mima is a species of beetle in the family Cerambycidae. It was described by Belon in 1903. It is known from Peru and Bolivia.

References

Colobotheini
Beetles described in 1903